XHERP-FM (branded as "boom 104.7") is a Mexican Spanish-language FM radio station that serves the Tampico, Tamaulipas market area broadcasting on 104.7 MHz FM.

History
XERP-AM 1330 received its concession on November 10, 1958. The station broadcast from Ciudad Madero and was owned by Juan Gualberto Guerra Luna. His estate owned XERP/XHERP until 2013. It broadcast grupera music as a local station called La Tremenda and then repeated W Radio before the transition to Boom FM.

External links
 
 
 radiostationworld.com List of radio stations in Tamaulipas

References

Spanish-language radio stations
Radio stations in Tampico